Alabo Tuwonimi Tuonims (born 16 February 1996), better known by his stage name Ninety, is a Nigerian singer, songwriter and music producer.

Biography

Ninety was born on 16 February 1996 in Port Harcourt is a Nigerian singer, songwriter, multi-instrumentalist, and
record producer. He grew up
in an Anglican household and is the fourth of five children and the only
male. Ninety attended Kings & Queens High School and Spring
Foundation School, both in Bonny Island, Rivers State, for his primary
and secondary education respectively. He grew up listening to Michael
Jackson, Damian Marley, and Styl Plus, and started writing his own
music as early as age 15.

Career
On the 19th of March, 2022. Following the release of his debut single, Unruly, Ninety released Touch & Follow, his second single after joining Freeme Music.

Ninety adds a new fluidity to the wave of sounds emerging in this multi-genre. Formerly known as Ninety6, he identifies as an Afro-Fusion artist, seamlessly blending Pop, R&B, Dancehall, and Reggae. 

In April 2022. Ninety released Diamond a lead single from his debut project Rare Gem.

On 28 April 2023, Ninety released his debut project titled Rare Gem. In his review of the extended play, Motolani Alake from Pulse Nigeria says "his approach aligns with his minimalistic appearance; handsome yet embellished with dreads, strong forearms and avant-garde sense of style, complete with dreads and limited jewelry."

Honors
On 18 May 2023, Apple Music announced Ninety  as the Apple Music Up Next for Nigeria. Commenting on the feature, Ninety said, “It’s a beautiful thing making music and telling stories, but it’s more beautiful when you have people listening to the music, and can resonate with the stories I tell. That connection is unmatched, and it’s why I’m excited to be selected for Apple Music’s ‘Up Next’ programme,” he told Apple Music.

Discography

EPs

Singles

See also

 List of Nigerian musicians

References

Living people
2002 births
Musicians from Port Harcourt
Nigerian male singer-songwriters
21st-century Nigerian male singers
Nigerian singers